The position of Provincial Secretary was particularly important in Manitoba from 1870 to 1874, as that province's institutions were being established. The province had no Premier during this period, and its Lieutenant-Governor acted as the de facto leader of government. The early Provincial Secretaries (including Alfred Boyd and Henry Joseph Clarke) were the most prominent elected officials in the province, and are retrospectively regarded as Premiers in many modern sources.

List of Provincial Secretaries
 Alfred Boyd 1870-1871
 Marc-Amable Girard 1871-1872
 Thomas Howard 1871-1872
 Henry Joseph Clarke 1872-1874
 Joseph Royal 1872-1874
 Marc-Amable Girard 1874
 John Norquay 1875-1876
 Corydon Partlow Brown 1878-1879
 Marc Amable Girard 1879-1881
 Alphonse Alfred Clement Riviere 1881-1883
 Alexander MacBeth Sutherland 1883-1884
 David Henry Wilson 1884-1886
 Corydon Partlow Brown 1886-1887
 John Norquay 1886-1887
 Joseph Burke 1887-1888
 James Emile Pierre Prendergast 1888-1889
 Daniel Dennis McLean 1889-1892
 John Donald Cameron 1893-1896
 Charles Julius Mickle 1895-1900
 David Henry McFadden 1900-1907
 Stanley William McInnis 1908
 George Robson Coldwell KC 1907-1908
 James Henry Howden 1908-1915
 Rodmond Palen Roblin 1911-1913
 William James Armstrong 1915-1922
 Duncan Lloyd McLeod 1922-1923
 Charles Reginald Lionel Cannon 1927
 Donald Gordon McKenzie 1928-1929
 Duncan Lloyd McLeod 1929-1935
 John Bracken 1935-1939
 John Stewart McDiarmid 1939-1946
 Charles Edwin Greenlay 1946-1948
 Wallace Conrad Miller 1948-1950
 Charles Edwin Greenlay 1950-1953
 Edmond Prefontaine 1953-1958
 Marcel Boulic 1958-1959
 John Benson Carroll 1959
 Edward Gurney Vaux Evans 1959-1963
 Maitland Steinkopf 1963-1966

Reference:

References

Government of Manitoba